Miss Switzerland or Miss Universe Switzerland is a national Beauty pageant in Switzerland. The pageant was founded in 1951, where the winners were sent to Miss Universe.

History

Began in 1951 Miss Switzerland resulted Jacqueline Genton as the first ever Miss Switzerland and won the Miss Europa 1951 title. In 1953 Miss Switzerland was sponsored by Bea Kasse4. Since that year Miss Switzerland winning title automatically competes at Miss Universe competition. Between 1975 and 1976 Miss Switzerland was handled by Sylvia Grivelli (Valais) and founded the "Miss Suisse Organisation AG" (also referred to as "Miss Schweiz Organisation AG"). Later the organization was handled by Raffy Locher, Christoph Locher, and Karina Berger. In the past, the Miss Switzerland also franchised the Miss Europe, Miss World and Miss International. The pageants languages are French and German. The Miss Universe representative is chosen through an independent pageant organised by the Miss and Mister Suisse Francophone Organisation.

Procedure
Candidates are selected by television viewers and a jury. The winner is awarded the title Miss Switzerland (German: Miss Schweiz, French: Miss Suisse, Italian: Miss Svizzera, Romansh: Miss Svizra). Since 1976, the pageant is organized by "Miss Schweiz Organisation AG". Began in 2018 the new leaders of Miss Switzerland Organization will be handled by Angela Fuchs, Iwan Meyer and Andrea Meyer.

Franchise holders
The Miss Switzerland pageant is the national franchise holder for Miss Universe.

Titleholders

Canton Ranking of Winners

Titleholders under Miss Schweiz org.

Miss Universe Switzerland

The main winner of Miss Switzerland represents her country at Miss Universe. The separate pageant "Miss Universe Switzerland" held in 2014 and 2016.

See also 
 Miss World Switzerland

References

External links
 Official site
 360 Virtual Tour of 2011 Event

 
Miss
Swiss awards
Recurring events established in 1951
1951 establishments in Switzerland
Switzerland